The Rural Municipality of Longlaketon No. 219 is a rural municipality (RM) in the Canadian province of Saskatchewan within Census Division No. 6 and  Division No. 2.

History 
The RM of Longlaketon No. 219 incorporated as a rural municipality on December 12, 1910.

Heritage properties
There are three historical sites located within the RM.
Eddy School No. 1846 - Constructed in 1922, the site contains a one-room school house that served as a school from 1922–1936, 1943–1957.  The school is located near Earl Grey.
Longlaketon United Church (also called the Longlaketon Presbyterian Church) - Constructed in 1886, the building is now used as the Longlaketon Community Hall.  Church services were held from 1886 to 1969. 
Zion (North Southey) Lutheran Church - Constructed in 1926, by immigrants from the imperial Austrian Empire, the church provides services in German until the 1960s.

Demographics 

Government 
The RM of Longlaketon No. 219 is governed by an elected municipal council and an appointed administrator that meets on the second Tuesday of every month. The reeve of the RM is Delbert Schmidt while its administrator is Courtney Huber. The RM's office is located in Earl Grey.

References 

Longlaketon

Division No. 6, Saskatchewan